SIM Studio (also known as Studio Smolec) is a Croatian recording studio owned by Vladimir Smolec and Tomo in der Mühlen founded in the 1980s in Zagreb. Productions of SIM studio sold in tens of millions LPs of all the most influential Yugoslav artists. SIM studio produced and discovered many new artists, among them Plavi Orkestar. Vladimir Smolec and Tomo in der Muhlen were constantly voted as two of the most influential people in the regional music industry by the music magazine Džuboks.

Selected artists
Ekatarina Velika
Film
Parni Valjak
Pankrti
Bijelo Dugme
Oliver Mandić
Zabranjeno Pusenje
Haustor
Plavi orkestar
Boško Petrović
Housepainters
Jasmin Stavros
Rajko Dujmić
Karlowy Vary

Albums recorded

Recording studios in Croatia
Culture in Zagreb